Melanie Kinnaman (born December 18, 1953) is an American dancer, film and stage actress. She is best known for her role as Pam in the 1985 horror film Friday the 13th: A New Beginning. She later co-starred with Eric Roberts in Best of the Best. Kinnaman has an upcoming role in the Kevin Costner produced The Gray House

Kinnaman has also made guest appearances on television in programs such as Hill Street Blues, The People Next Door and Cheers. She is still acting and working on projects for stage, television and film.

Biography
Kinnaman was born and raised in Holyoke, Massachusetts, where she attended Holyoke High School, and later, the Williston Northampton School in Easthampton.

After graduating from high school, Kinnaman relocated to New York City where she appeared in several Off-Broadway productions, attempted to obtain roles in soap operas as well as appearing in commercials. She relocated to Los Angeles in 1982, and eight months later appeared in a thirteen-week run of General Hospital.

In 1984, Kinnaman was cast as a drug-addicted prostitute in Cannon Films's Thunder Alley (1985). She was subsequently cast as the lead heroine, Pam, in Friday the 13th: A New Beginning. She was originally going to reprise her role as Pam (who evidently survived in the previous film) in Friday the 13th Part VI: Jason Lives, but Paramount Pictures changed  the concept of the sequel and the character was written out.

Filmography

References

Works cited

External links

 

1953 births
Living people
American female dancers
American dancers
American film actresses
American television actresses
American stage actresses
Actresses from Massachusetts
People from Holyoke, Massachusetts
Williston Northampton School alumni